Takeyuki Watanabe (born April 18, 1968, in Gifu Prefecture, Japan) is a Japanese politician who has served as a member of the House of Councillors of Japan since 2010. He represents the Gifu at-large district and is a member of the Liberal Democratic Party.

He is one of three State Ministers for Reconstruction in the Second Kishida Cabinet.

References 

Members of the House of Councillors (Japan)
1968 births
Living people
21st-century Japanese politicians